Jules Verne Cycle is the third studio album by Peter Frohmader, released in 1987 by Auricle Records. It was remastered and issued on CD for the first time on October 13, 2014 by Cosmic Egg for a limited run of 20 pressings.

Track listing

Personnel
Adapted from the Jules Verne Cycle liner notes.
 Peter Frohmader – synthesizer, Rhodes piano, percussion, acoustic piano (A-side), acoustic twelve-string guitar (A-side), production, recording, cover art

Release history

References

External links 
 

1987 albums
Peter Frohmader albums
Music based on works by Jules Verne
Works based on The Mysterious Island